Martha Maria Yeardley Smith (born July 3, 1964) is an American actress, artist and writer. She currently stars as the voice of Lisa Simpson on the long-running animated television series The Simpsons.

Smith became an actress in 1982 after graduating from drama school.  She moved to New York City in 1984, where she appeared in the Broadway production of Tom Stoppard's The Real Thing. She made her film debut in 1985's Heaven Help Us, followed by roles in The Legend of Billie Jean and Maximum Overdrive. She moved to Los Angeles in 1986 and took a recurring role in the television series Brothers.

In 1987, Smith auditioned for the Simpsons shorts on The Tracey Ullman Show. Smith intended to audition for the role of Bart Simpson, but the casting director felt her voice was too high, and she was cast as Bart's sister Lisa. In 1989, the shorts were spun off into their own half-hour show, The Simpsons. For her work on The Simpsons, Smith received a Primetime Emmy Award for Outstanding Voice-Over Performance in 1992.

Alongside The Simpsons, Smith appeared in the sitcom Herman's Head as Louise, and had recurring appearances as Marlene on Dharma & Greg and as Penny in two episodes of Dead Like Me. She has appeared in several films, including City Slickers, Just Write, Toys, and As Good as It Gets. In 2004, Smith performed an off-Broadway one-woman show entitled More at the Union Square Theatre in New York City. Aside from The Simpsons, Smith has recorded few voice-over parts, only commercials and the film We're Back! A Dinosaur's Story. Smith starred in and served as executive producer for the independent romantic comedy Waiting For Ophelia, which had its world premiere at the Phoenix Film Festival in April 2009.

Early life
Smith was born on July 3, 1964, in Paris, France. Her father, Joseph Smith, worked for United Press International in Paris and moved to Washington, D.C., in 1966, where he became The Washington Post's first official obituary editor. Her mother, Martha Mayor, was a paper conservator for the Freer and Sackler Galleries at the Smithsonian Institution. Smith's parents later divorced. Her maternal grandfather was art historian A. Hyatt Mayor, and among her great-grandparents were marine biologist and zoologist Alpheus Hyatt and artist and sculptor Harriet Randolph Hyatt Mayor. She is also the paternal niece of political scientist, historian, and Latin American studies specialist Peter H. Smith. Smith has labeled her family "upper crust and reserved". As a child, Smith was often teased because of her unusual voice. Smith has stated: "I've sounded pretty much the same way since I was six. Maybe [my voice is] a little deeper now." She made her acting debut in a sixth-grade play.

Career

Early career
Smith became a professional actress in 1982 after graduating from drama school. After appearances in a number of school plays, she joined the local Arena Stage theater group on an apprenticeship, featuring in their production of Peter Pan. She went on to star in several other plays in Washington. She moved to New York City in 1984 and appeared in the Broadway production of Tom Stoppard's play The Real Thing alongside Jeremy Irons and Glenn Close.

Smith's first film role came in Heaven Help Us (1985). She then played Putter in The Legend of Billie Jean (also 1985). The film was a box office bomb and critically panned, although Smith "thought it would be the movie that launched my career. And then it was out at the box office about 10 days before it died." When filming was over, she rejoined The Real Thing before being out of work for six months. Smith worried her career was over. However, the following year, she played Connie in Stephen King's Maximum Overdrive (1986), noting it was "truly a dreadful film, but I had a great part in it."

Smith moved to Los Angeles in 1986 on the "semi-promise" of a part in a TV film. After the audition, the role was given to another actress. Smith realized "that people don't mean what they say. It's not malicious. They just don't realize how much impact they have on an impressionable actor – and all actors are impressionable." From then on, she decided to "just sort of build a wall around myself", to cope with the disappointment of not getting a part. In Los Angeles, Smith appeared in theatrical productions of Living on Salvation Street, for which she was paid $14 for each performance, Boys and Girls/Men and Women, and How the Other Half Loves, and played the recurring role of Louella Waters on the Showtime series Brothers. She appeared in the films The Legend of Billie Jean and Ginger Ale Afternoon (1989) as "trailer-park girls". She later spoke of her regrets of appearing in the latter in her one-woman show More.

The Simpsons

Smith's longest-running role is voicing Lisa Simpson on The Simpsons. She has voiced Lisa since 1987, beginning with The Simpsons shorts on The Tracey Ullman Show. Smith had initially been asked to audition for the role of Lisa's brother Bart, but casting director Bonita Pietila thought her voice was too high. Smith later recalled "I always sounded too much like a girl, I read two lines as Bart and they said, 'Thanks for coming!'" Smith was given the role of Lisa, instead. She denies rumors that she almost turned down the role, though admits she had never planned a career in voice-over work. Pietila stated that, having seen her in Living on Salvation Street, Smith was always her preferred choice. Smith lifts her voice up slightly to perform the role. Lisa is the only regular character voiced by Smith, although in some earlier episodes, she provided some of Maggie's squeaks and occasional speaking parts. Smith has only voiced characters other than Lisa on very rare occasions, with those characters usually being some derivative of Lisa, such as Lisa Bella in "Last Tap Dance in Springfield" and Lisa, Jr. in "Missionary: Impossible" (both from season 11 in 2000). Smith spends two days a week recording the show.

Until 1998, Smith was paid $30,000 per episode. During a pay dispute in 1998, Fox threatened to replace the six main voice actors with new actors, going as far as preparing to cast new voices. However, the dispute was soon resolved and she received $125,000 per episode until 2004, when the voice actors demanded that they be paid $360,000 per episode. The issue was resolved a month later, and Smith earned $250,000 per episode. After salary renegotiations in 2008, the voice actors received about $400,000 per episode. Three years later, with Fox threatening to cancel the series unless production costs were cut, Smith and the other cast members accepted a 25% pay cut, down to just over $300,000 per episode.

Despite her world-famous role, Smith is rarely recognized in public, which she does not mind, saying, "it's wonderful to be in the midst of all this hype about the show, and people enjoying the show so much, and to be totally a fly on the wall; people never recognise me solely from my voice." In a 2009 interview with The Guardian, she commented: "It's the best job ever. I have nothing but gratitude for the amount of freedom The Simpsons has bought me in my life."

Smith received a Primetime Emmy Award in 1992, but felt it was not worth anything, saying "there's part of me that feels it wasn't even a real Emmy." The Emmy for Outstanding Voice-Over Performance is a Creative Arts and not handed out during the primetime telecast and, prior to 2009, was a juried award without nominations. However, Smith says "if I had to be associated with one character in fiction, I will always be thrilled that it was Lisa Simpson." The show's creator Matt Groening has called Smith very similar to Lisa: "Yeardley has strong moral views about her character. There are lines that are written for Lisa that Yeardley reads and says, 'No, I wouldn't say that. Writer Jay Kogen praised her performance on the show, particularly in the episode "Lisa's Substitute", as able "to move past comedy to something really strong and serious and dramatic".

Further career
From 1991 to 1994, alongside The Simpsons, Smith was one of the lead cast members in the sitcom Herman's Head as Louise. Her other television roles include recurring appearances as Marlene on Dharma & Greg, and Penny in two episodes of Dead Like Me. Smith has also appeared in Phil of the Future and Teen Angel. Her one-scene role as pregnant checkout girl Nancy in 1991's City Slickers earned her "more attention than all [her] previous roles combined", and taught her "that it's far better to have small parts in big movies that everyone sees." In 1997, she appeared as Lulu the palm reader in the independent film Just Write. Her other roles include parts in Barry Levinson's Toys and James L. Brooks' As Good as It Gets. Brooks, who is also executive producer of The Simpsons, had cast Smith in his 1994 film I'll Do Anything (in one of the film's musical numbers), but her part was cut. Aside from The Simpsons, Smith has recorded few voice-over parts, only commercials and the film We're Back! A Dinosaur's Story. She "had a voice-over agent for about two years, and I used to go out [on auditions] all the time, but it never really came to anything. Everybody said, 'Oh Yeardley, you'll clean up,' and that was definitely not the case."

In 2004, Smith performed her own off-Broadway one-woman show entitled More at the Union Square Theatre in New York City. Directed by Judith Ivey, the play is about her mixed feelings over the success of The Simpsons, her parents, her relationships, and her struggles with bulimia. The New York Times critic Margo Jefferson called it an "appealing if overlong show", adding that "The career narrative needed shortening. This would involve some editing and revising but wouldn't taint the best parts of More. It is refreshing to hear a celebrity talk cleanly about being fame-driven and about not getting the degree or the kind of fame you craved. It's fun to watch a skilled actress use her craft to the full." She would later perform the play for three weeks in Los Angeles the following year.

Smith starred in and served as executive producer for the independent romantic comedy Waiting for Ophelia, which was released in 2009. She funded the film, which was written by Adam Carl and based on a stage play he wrote in 2003. She said: "I loved it. I never get to play parts like that. I always play the friend of a friend, never the lead. And the script surprised me." Carl stated it was very unlikely she would recoup her money, but Smith decided she "believe[d] in this project, and my expectations have already been fulfilled by making the movie", and added: "You can support art even if it's not going to make a zillion dollars." It premiered on April 4, 2009, at the Phoenix Film Festival.

In 2011, Smith starred as Ms. Miller in the movie The Chaperone alongside Triple H and Ariel Winter.

In June 2016, the Human Rights Campaign released a video in tribute to the victims of the Orlando nightclub shooting; in the video, Smith and others told the stories of the people killed there. On March 30, 2019, Smith was honored with the Human Rights Campaign's National Leadership Award in Los Angeles for her work as an advocate of the LGBT community.

In 2017, Smith started a podcast, Small Town Dicks, which explores real life crime in small towns in the United States. Smith had co-hosted the podcast with actress and long-time friend Zibby Allen until March 2019 when the two filed lawsuits against one another, with Allen accusing Smith of pushing her out of ownership and profit rights from the show.

Politics
Smith is a lifelong Democrat.

In 2018, Smith challenged Republican Ted Cruz after he disparagingly labeled the Democratic Party "the party of Lisa Simpson". Smith recommended that people of differing political views should be able to work together on gun control, promoting gay rights and environmentalism.

Personal life
Smith married English-Canadian actor Christopher Grove in 1990. They were divorced in 1992, citing irreconcilable differences.

In a 1997 interview with The Daily Targum, Smith stated "I am shy, but I have an extroverted persona which I can draw on when I need to," and that she is a "private" actress.

She married Daniel Erickson in 2002; the marriage lasted for six years and Smith filed for divorce on May 21, 2008, citing irreconcilable differences.

In 2009, she commented, "People have said to me that I'm unassuming. It's true, I'm the worst celebrity ever. But I'm trying to become better."

Smith had bulimia when she was a teenager. She noted "It would make me high, I would feel endorphins and this great sense of victory."

Smith enjoys writing and painting. During the first season of Herman's Head, Smith taught herself to paint by copying other artists. The book Just Humor Me includes a story, "The Race", written by Smith. She has written a children's book, I, Lorelei, which was published by HarperCollins in February 2009.

In 2011, Smith launched a women's shoe line called Marchez Vous.

On June 11, 2022, Smith married one of the co-hosts of her podcast, Small Town Dicks, Detective (Ret) Dan Grice. She met him while he was providing personal security for her during a Simpsons event.

Filmography

Film

Television

Video games

Music videos

Theme park

Podcasts

References

External links

 
 
 Yeardley Smith  at the Voice Chasers Database
 Yeardley Smith at HarperCollins.com
 Yeardley Smith's Personal Blog at Tumblr
 

Living people
American film actresses
American television actresses
American video game actresses
American voice actresses
Primetime Emmy Award winners
Actresses from Paris
Actresses from Washington, D.C.
20th-century American actresses
21st-century American actresses
1964 births
American LGBT rights activists
Washington (state) Democrats
California Democrats